The Colognian declension system describes how the Colognian language alters words to reflect their roles in Colognian sentences, such as subject, direct object, indirect object, agent, patient, etc. Declension allows speakers to mark nouns as being used in their different roles – whether as subjects, direct objects, indirect objects, possessives, etc. – by changing the form of the noun plus any associated adjectives or articles instead of indicating this meaning through word order or prepositions (although this also happens in Colognian). Still, Colognian generally makes only limited use of word order; shifting words around either does not alter the meanings of sentences, or yields other types of sentences which have different meanings yet still maintain the roles of the referents of the words as long as their declined forms are kept.

Colognian is a predominantly fusional language. It marks its articles, adjectives, nouns, pronouns, and more to distinguish gender, case, and number.

Colognian today distinguishes between five cases: nominative, genitive, dative, accusative, and vocative. There are two kinds of genitives, both of which are periphrastic. One is normally positioned before the noun or noun phrase it refers to, the other always behind.

There are three grammatical genders in Colognian: feminine, masculine, and neuter. Almost all nouns have fixed genders, but there is a class of nouns that may switch gender from predominantly neuter to feminine on certain occasions. These almost always refer to female persons. Colognian shares this property with a large number of local and vernacular languages running almost the entire length of the Rhine river.

There are two grammatical numbers in Colognian: singular and plural. While a few individual words implicitly have either singular forms only or plural forms only and cannot be marked as the other, almost all nouns exhibit both forms.

Colognian has three grammatical persons: 1st person, 2nd person, and 3rd person. The plural form of the 1st person makes no semantic or formal distinction so as to differentiate between inclusion or exclusion of a 2nd person or a 3rd person, i.e. it always means: "me, but not me alone".

Articles 
Colognian grammatical articles come in several flavours:
 stressed definite articles, or demonstrative articles:  (the, this, that)
 unstressed definite articles:  (the)
 indefinite articles:  (a, an, ∅)
 possessive articles:  (her, his, its, my, our, their, your)

Usage and semantics 
 A demonstrative article, or stressed definite article, marks a select or specific one out of a set of possible ones, or a focused, special, specific, or only one.
 Example: 
 An unstressed definite article is used to mark something unambiguous, known, having been mentioned already, not having a focus, or something general, but not arbitrary.
 Example: 
 An indefinite article marks something arbitrary, something unspecific, unspecified ones out of many, something general, or lacking individuality.
 Example: 
 A possessive article marks something as being part of, belonging to or relating to something else.
 Example:   Colognian has possessive pronouns which can replace articles in phrases and expressions. In other words, a sentence can have either a possessive pronoun or an article in those positions but not both. Thus, these possessive pronouns can also be termed possessive articles when used in such cases. Since declension does not differ for possessive pronouns and possessive articles, declension is listed only once, under Possessive Pronouns.

Article declensions

Numbers 
(**) Singular is always used when there is exactly one instance of something. It may also occasionally be found with numbers having "one" at the end such as 1001, depending on how such figures are expressed. Plural is used for anything else but zero. With zero instances of something, either the singular or the plural might be chosen depending on the context and the particular noun.

Pronouns 
In Colognian, pronouns come in several variations.
There are demonstrative pronouns, stressed definite personal pronouns, unstressed definite personal pronouns,  possessive pronouns, etc.

Pronoun use and semantics 
Colognian demonstrative pronouns are used in sentences in positions where a noun phrase led by a stressed or demonstrative article could be used as well. The pronoun 'replaces' it for brevity. In fact, a demonstrative pronoun can formally be seen as a noun phrase with the article retained and anything else spared, because grammar forms of demonstrative pronouns and those of demonstrative articles exhibit no differences. Demonstrative pronouns are either strict anaphora, or can be cataphora being resolved within the same or next sentence or subsentence. The use as exophora is possible and reduces the choice of intonation and stress patterns to exactly one, most commonly supported by appropriate gestures.
 Example of cataphoric use: 
 Example of anaphoric use: 

There are personal pronouns for a variety of uses in Colognian. They all have in common that they link declension with an aspect of conjugation with their forms. While Colognian declension follows a case, gender, number scheme, the personal pronouns also decline for person. This scheme includes three grammatical persons: the 1st person which refers to the speaker or speakers as agents or patients of a sentence; the 2nd person which addresses the listener or listeners of the speaker or speakers as agents or patients of a sentence; and the 3rd person which refers to something or someone else besides the speaker(s) or the listener(s) as the agents or patients of a sentence. These three persons may be found in two grammatical numbers: singular and plural. Thus declined forms of personal pronouns reflect case, gender, person and number. 

Most possessive pronouns have two distinct uses, though some have three.
 A possessive pronoun can replace an article, which is why Colognian possessive pronouns can also be called possessive articles.
 Example: 
 Like a demonstrative pronoun, a possessive pronoun can stand alone representing an entire noun phrase. Its use can be exophoric or strict anaphoric; a cataphoric use must be resolved within the same or next sentence or sub-sentence.
 Example: 
 One of the Cologinan genitives, namely the form having to precede its referent, can also be described as a possessive expression having the form: article-dative + noun-dative + possessive-pronoun-3rd person-nominative
 Example: 

Pronoun declensions

See also
 Colognian grammar

Notes and references

Declension
Declension